Summerhill is a residential locality in the local government areas (LGA) of Launceston (96%) and Meander Valley (4%) in the Launceston LGA region of Tasmania. The 2016 census recorded a population of 3135 for the state suburb of Summerhill.
It is a suburb of Launceston.

Summerhill is primarily a residential suburb and is home to Summerdale Primary School.

History 
Summerhill was gazetted as a locality in 1963.

The area was officially gazetted as "Summerdale" in 1957, but this appears to have been a mistake, as it had been known as "Summerhill" for up to a century beforehand. A regazzetting in 1963 officially named it "Summerhill". Despite this, the name of the school has not changed.

Geography
The South Esk River forms the north-western boundary.

Road infrastructure 
National Route 1 (Midland Highway) passes to the east. From there, several roads provide access to the locality.

References

Suburbs of Launceston, Tasmania
Localities of City of Launceston
Localities of Meander Valley Council